Euryope is a genus of leaf beetles in the subfamily Eumolpinae. It is distributed in Africa and the Arabian Peninsula.

Species

 Euryope angulicollis Fairmaire, 1882
 Euryope barkeri Jacoby, 1904
 Euryope batesi Jacoby, 1880
 Euryope bipartita Jacoby, 1897
 Euryope cingulata Baly, 1860
 Euryope consobrina Lefèvre, 1875
 Euryope costata Clavareau, 1909
 Euryope cruciata Lefèvre, 1887
 Euryope discicollis Jacoby, 1895
 Euryope discoidalis Jacoby, 1897
 Euryope hoehneli Lefèvre, 1889
 Euryope humeralis Pic, 1939
 Euryope laeviuscula Weise, 1908
 Euryope lightfooti Péringer, 1899
 Euryope marginalis Ancey, 1882
 Euryope megacephala (J. Thomson, 1856)
 Euryope minuta Jacoby, 1880
 Euryope monstrosa Baly, 1862
 Euryope nigricollis Jacoby, 1897
 Euryope nigrita Baly, 1881
 Euryope notabilis Péringuey, 1892
 Euryope pictipennis Jacoby, 1895
 Euryope pulchella Baly, 1881
 Euryope rubrifrons (Fabricius, 1787)
 Euryope rugulosa Weise, 1919
 Euryope sanguinea (Olivier, 1808)
 Euryope sauberlichi Weise, 1904
 Euryope simplex Weise, 1915
 Euryope subserricornis (Latreille, 1806)
 Euryope terminalis Baly, 1860
 Euryope vanderijsti Burgeon, 1941
 Euryope wellmani Clavareau, 1909

References

Eumolpinae
Chrysomelidae genera
Beetles of Africa
Beetles of Asia
Taxa named by Johan Wilhelm Dalman